was a Japanese politician. He was born in Hyōgo Prefecture. He was governor of Kagawa Prefecture (1941-1942) and Nagano Prefecture (1942-1943).

Bibliography
 Ikuhiko Hata, Comprehensive Encyclopedia of the Japanese Bureaucracy: 1868 - 2000,University of Tokyo Press, 2001.

References

1895 births
1943 deaths
Governors of Kagawa Prefecture
Governors of Nagano
Japanese Home Ministry government officials
People from Hyōgo Prefecture